David Sage is an American television actor known for his various roles in television in the 1980s and 1990s. Among the many shows he was in, Sage appeared in such shows as: The Practice, The West Wing, Star Trek: The Next Generation, L.A. Law, Murder, She Wrote, Monsters, and Hill Street Blues.
He also appeared in the TV movie Rock Hudson (1990) as Harold Rhoden (a Los Angeles lawyer) and Cannibal Holocaust (1985).

External links

Year of birth missing (living people)
Living people
American male television actors
Place of birth missing (living people)